Abubakar Khamis Bakary was an ACT Wazalendo politician in Tanzania.  He has been a Member of Parliament in the National Assembly.

In 2010 he became head of the Ministry of Justice and Constitutions Affairs. Then in 2015 he resigned from CUF and joined ACT Wazalendo in 2019.

Death
On 11 November 2020, Bakary died due to health reasons in Pemba, Zanzibar.

Sources

 Parliament of Tanzania website

2020 deaths
Year of birth missing
Members of the National Assembly (Tanzania)

Alliance for Change and Transparency politicians